Varsány is a village in Nógrád County, Hungary with 1,635 inhabitants (2014).

Location 

The village is located in Nógrád county, approximately 100 kilometres northeast from Budapest, the capital of Hungary and 21 kilometres from Hollókő. Varsány is bordered by Szécsény on the north, by Rimóc on the east, by Nógrádsipek on the south and by Csitár and Iliny on the west. Nearby this village there is Darázsdói-patak.

Sights 

 Saint Michael Roman Catholic Church (Szent Mihály Római Katolikus Templom)
 Chapel of Patrona Hungariae (Magyarok Nagyasszonya-kápolna)
 Calvary from the Church to Cemetery across Varsány
 Villagemuseum (Falumúzeum)
 Tábpuszta

Twin towns – sister cities
Varsány is twinned with:

  Radzovce, Slovakia  
  Otmuchów, Poland
  Sedziejowice, Poland
  Crăciunel, Romania
  Palić, Serbia

Populated places in Nógrád County